Adetomyrma clarivida is a species of ant that belongs to the genus Adetomyrma. It is a blind species native to Madagascar. It was described by Yoshimura & Fisher in 2012.

References

Amblyoponinae
Blind animals
Insects described in 2012
Hymenoptera of Africa
Endemic fauna of Madagascar